George Farmer Burgess (September 21, 1861 – December 31, 1919) was a U.S. Representative from Texas.

Biography
Born in Wharton, Texas, Burgess attended the common schools.
He moved with his mother to Fayette County in 1880 and engaged in agricultural pursuits near Flatonia.
He was later employed as a clerk in a country store.
He studied law.
He was admitted to the bar in 1882 and commenced practice in La Grange, Texas.
He moved to Gonzales in 1884.
He served as prosecuting attorney of Gonzales County from 1886 to 1889, when he resigned.

Burgess was elected as a Democrat to the Fifty-seventh and to the seven succeeding Congresses (March 4, 1901 – March 3, 1917).
He was an unsuccessful candidate for the Democratic nomination of United States Senator in 1916.
He resumed the practice of law at Gonzales, Texas, where he died December 31, 1919.
He was interred in the Masonic Cemetery.

Sources

1861 births
1919 deaths
Democratic Party members of the United States House of Representatives from Texas
19th-century American politicians
People from Wharton, Texas
People from Gonzales, Texas